The Portrait of a Lady is a British television series which originally aired on BBC One during 1968. An adaptation of the novel The Portrait of a Lady by Henry James, it starred Suzanne Neve and Richard Chamberlain.

The cast also included Edward Fox, Sarah Brackett, Beatrix Lehmann, Kathleen Byron, Rachel Gurney and James Maxwell.

Originally broadcast in black and white before BBC One could transmit colour television, the series survived the BBC's archival purge in full colour and is available on DVD.

Cast
Richard Chamberlain as Ralph Touchett
Suzanne Neve as Isabel Archer  
Sarah Brackett as Henrietta Stackpole 
Beatrix Lehmann as Mrs. Lydia Touchett
Rachel Gurney as Madame Merle 
James Maxwell as Gilbert Osmond 
Kathleen Byron as Countess Gemini 
Ed Bishop as Caspar Goodwood 
Edward Fox as Lord Warburton 
Sharon Gurney as Pansy 
Angus MacKay as Mr. Bantling 
Alan Gifford as Mr. Daniel Touchett 
Susan Tebbs as Constance 
Felicity Gibson as Mildred
Cavan Kendall as Ned Rosier 
Rosalind Atkinson as Sister Catherine 
Margaret Corey as Maid 
Kevork Malikyan as Servant 
Marguerite Young as Nun 
Kitty Fitzgerald as Sister Theresa 
Michael Reubens as Messenger
Richard Young as Receptionist
Howard Charlton as Porter
John DeVaut as Servant

References

Bibliography
 Hischak, Thomas S. American Literature on Stage and Screen: 525 Works and Their Adaptations. McFarland, 2014.

External links
 

BBC television dramas
1968 British television series debuts
1968 British television series endings
1960s British drama television series
English-language television shows
Television series set in the 19th century